Earias vernana is a species of moth in the family Nolidae first described by Johan Christian Fabricius in 1787. It is found in most of southern and central Europe.

The wingspan is 20–23 mm. Adults are on wing from May to mid August in one generation per year.

The larvae feed on Populus alba. It lives on the end of the twigs of the host plant, in spun together leaves. Pupation takes place in a brown cocoon. They can be found from August to September.

References

External links

"10459 Earias vernana (Fabricius, 1787) - Silberpappel-Kahneulchen". Lepiforum e. V. Retrieved August 7, 2020. 

Nolidae
Moths described in 1787
Moths of Europe
Taxa named by Johan Christian Fabricius